Once Upon a Time (French: Il était une fois) is a 1933 French drama film directed by Léonce Perret and starring Gaby Morlay, André Luguet and Andrée Ducret.

It was shot at the Joinville Studios in Paris. The film's sets were designed by the art director Guy de Gastyne.

Cast
 Gaby Morlay as Ellen et Mary 
 André Luguet as Patrick O'Leary 
 Andrée Ducret as Lady Baconshire 
 Jean-Max as Baddington 
 Madeleine Geoffroy as Miss Curtis 
 Georges Mauloy as Le docteur Samwood 
 André Dubosc as Lord Leftsbury 
 Jean Bara as Le petit Bobby 
 Gaston Dubosc as Parker 
 André Nicolle as Mister Curtis 
 Pierre Darmant as Herbett 
 Louis Lorsy as John 
 Alex Bernard as Alfred
 Pierre Larquey as Redno

References

Bibliography 
 Dayna Oscherwitz & MaryEllen Higgins. The A to Z of French Cinema. Scarecrow Press, 2009.

External links 
 

1933 films
French drama films
1933 drama films
1930s French-language films
Films directed by Léonce Perret
Pathé films
Films shot at Joinville Studios
French black-and-white films
1930s French films